Pınargözü is a village in the Yüksekova District of Hakkâri Province in Turkey. The village is populated by Kurds of the Doski tribe and had a population of 325 in 2021.

The three unpopulated hamlets of Inceyol, Kışlacık and Yeşilce are attached to Pınargözü.

References 

Villages in Yüksekova District
Kurdish settlements in Hakkâri Province